Mariano Gallo (born December 22, 1976), known by the stage name Priscilla, is an Italian drag performer based in Mykonos, Greece, best known for hosting the drag competition television series Drag Race Italia.

Career 
Priscilla gained notoriety in Italy after being on the talk show Al posto tuo beginning in 2002. In 2007, she won the Miss Drag Queen Italy pageant. In 2017, she performed on Ellada Eheis Talento. In September 2021, Priscilla was announced as the host of the first season of Drag Race Italia.

Priscilla regularly performs in Mykonos.

In 2022, Gallo starred as Cecil Beaton in the musical Dive.

Early and personal life 
Gallo was born in 1976 in Campania. He is originally from Naples. He is gay, and first came out at age 19.

Gallo was raised Catholic, but later adopted Buddhism.

Filmography

Television

References

1976 births
Living people
Drag Race Italia
Italian drag queens
LGBT Buddhists
People from Naples